Webster Middle School can refer to:
Webster Middle School (Los Angeles)
Webster Middle School (Stockton, California)